Whale Beach is a northern beachside suburb of Sydney, in the state of New South Wales, Australia. Whale Beach is located 40 kilometres north of the Sydney central business district, in the local government area of Northern Beaches Council, in the Northern Beaches region.

Description
At the northern end of the beach, just off the rocks, is a well-known surf break called the Wedge. Immediately west of the beach is the Whale Beach Surf Life Saving Club.

History 
Whale Beach is the location of a distinctive home designed by the architect Alexander Stewart Jolly. On Careel Head, overlooking Whale Beach, Careel House is a single-storey bungalow made from sandstone blocks that were quarried at the site. Heritage-listed, it was built in 1931.Whale Beach is home to The Big Swim, an ocean swim of several kilometres from Palm Beach to Whale Beach. The Big Swim has been held in January each year since 1974.

References

External links 
Whale Beach, from Beachnet

Suburbs of Sydney
Beaches of New South Wales
Northern Beaches Council